Prathap Chandra Reddy (born 5 February 1933) is an Indian entrepreneur and cardiologist who founded the first corporate chain of hospitals in India, the Apollo Hospitals. India Today ranked him 48th in its 2017 list of India's 50 most powerful people.

Background
Reddy was awarded the Padma Bhushan in 1991 and received the Padma Vibhushan, which is India's second-highest civilian award, in 2010.

Personal life
Reddy was married at an early age to a lady of his own community and social background in a match arranged by their families in the usual Indian way. The couple are the parents of four children, all girls:
Preetha Reddy, 
Sangita Reddy, 
Suneeta Reddy, wife of P. Dwarakanath Reddy, son of P. Ahobala Reddy of Nippo Batteries and Dyanora TV)
Shobana Kamineni. Her daughter, Upasana, is married to Ram Charan, one of the most popular actors in Telugu cinema.

All of Reddy's daughters are serving as directors in the Apollo Hospitals.

Awards and recognition
 1991: Conferred with the honor Padma Bhushan 
 2010: Conferred with the second highest civilian honor Padma Vibhushan 
 2018: Conferred the Lions Humanitarian Award by Apollo Hospitals
2022: Conferred the Lifetime Achievement Award by IMA

References

External links

https://www.apollohospitals.com/corporate/apollo-management/chairman-profile

1933 births
Indian billionaires
Indian cardiologists
Indian chief executives
Living people
Recipients of the Padma Vibhushan in trade & industry
University of Madras alumni
Telugu people
Indian medical researchers
Recipients of the Padma Bhushan in medicine
People from Chittoor district
Businesspeople from Andhra Pradesh
20th-century Indian medical doctors
20th-century Indian businesspeople
Indian businesspeople in the healthcare industry
Medical doctors from Andhra Pradesh